Alec or Aleck is a Scottish form of the given name Alex. It may be a diminutive of the name Alexander or a given name in its own right. Notable people with the name include:

People
Alec Aalto (1942–2018), Finnish diplomat
Alec Acton (1938–1994), English footballer
Alec Albiston (1917–1998), Australian rules footballer
Alec Alston (1937–2009), English footballer
Alec and Peter Graham (1881–1957), New Zealand mountaineers, guides, and hotel operators
Alec Anderson (American football, born 1894) (1894–1953), American NFL player
Alec Asher (born 1991), American MLB player
Alec Ashworth (1939–1995), English professional footballer
Alec Astle (born 1949), New Zealand former cricketer
Alec Atkinson (1919–2015), British Royal Air Force officer and civil servant
Alec B. Francis (1867–1934), English silent-film actor
Alec Bagot (1893–1968), South Australian adventurer, polemicist, and politician
Alec Baillie (died 2020), American bassist
Alec Baldwin (born 1958), American actor
Alec Bangham (1921–2010), British biophysicist
Alec Bartlett (born 1993), American soccer player
Alec Bathgate, New Zealand musician
Alec Bedser (1918–2010), English professional cricketer
Alec Bedser (South African cricketer) (1948–1981), South African cricketer
Alec Beechman (1896–1965), British barrister and politician
Alec Benjamin (born 1994), American singer-songwriter
Alec Bennett (1897–1973), Irish-Canadian motorcycle racer
Alec Berg, American comedy- and television writer of Swedish descent
Alec Bettinger (born 1995), American MLB player
Alec Birrell (1885–1948), Australian rules footballer, military personnel, and doctor
Alec Birtwell (1908–1974), English cricketer
Alec Bishop (1897–1984), British Army officer and administrator
Alec Blakeman (1918–1994), English professional footballer
Alec Boden (1925–2011), Scottish footballer
Alec Bohm (born 1996), American MLB player
Alec Bonnett (1922–1992), British sports shooter
Alec Boswell Timms (1872–1922), Australian-born international rugby union player
Alec Brader (born 1942), English professional footballer, schoolteacher, and youth athletics coach
Alec Brady (1870–1913), Scottish professional footballer
Alec Bregonzi (1930–2006), English actor
Alec Briggs (born 1939), English former professional footballer
Alec Broers, Baron Broers (born 1938), British electrical engineer
Alec Brook (1911–1986), English international table tennis player
Alec Brook-Krasny (born 1958), American politician
Alec Brown (born 1992), American professional basketball player
Alec Brown (snooker player) (1908–1995), English snooker player
Alec Brownstein (born 1980), American creative marketer, writer, and film director
Alec Burgess (1906–1990), English cricketer
Alec Burks (born 1991), American NBA player
Alec Burleson (born 1998), American MLB player
Alec Burns (1907–2003), English track and field athlete
Alec Burns (cricketer) (born 1948), Trinidad and Tobago former cricketer
Alec Butler (born 1959), Canadian playwright
Alec C. Snowden (1901–1983), British film producer
Alec Cameron, several people
Alec Campbell (disambiguation), several people
Alec Cannon, English footballer
Alec Carruthers Gould (1870–1948), English illustrator and landscape- and marine painter
Alec Cartio (born 1976), Iranian-Swedish-American music video-, automotive commercial-, and film director
Alec Chamberlain (born 1964), English former professional footballer
Alec Cheyne (1907–1983), Scottish footballer
Alec Chien, classical pianist from Hong Kong
Alec Christie, British writer, film producer, and actor
Alec Clarey (born 1994), English rugby union player
Alec Clarke (1904–1959), South African cricketer
Alec Clegg (1909–1986), English educationalist
Alec Cleland (born 1970), Scottish professional footballer and coach
Alec Clifton-Taylor (1907–1985), English architectural historian
Alec Clunes (1912–1970), English actor and theatrical manager
Alec Clydesdale (1875–1947), Australian politician
Alec Cobbe (born 1945), Irish designer, artist, musical instrument collector, and decorator
Alec Coles (born 1959), British-Australian art curator
Alec Connell (1900–1958), Canadian NHL player
Alec Cooke, Baron Cooke of Islandreagh (1920–2007), Irish politician and Royal Navy officer
Alec Coombes (born 1995), Scottish rugby union player
Alec Coppel (1907–1972), Australian-born screenwriter, novelist, and playwright
Alec Coppen (1923–2019), British psychiatrist
Alec Coryton (1895–1981), British Air Force commander
Alec Cowan (born 1996), Canadian cyclist
Alec Coxon (1916–2006), English cricketer
Alec Craig (1884–1945), Scottish actor
Alec Crikis (1944–2016), Australian sports shooter
Alec Croft (born 1937), English former professional footballer
Alec Crozier (1904–1974), Australian rules footballer
Alec Cunningham (1905–1981), English cricketer
Alec Cunningham-Reid (1895–1977), British military personnel
Alec D. Gallimore, American aerospace engineer
Alec Dankworth (born 1960), English jazz musician
Alec David Young (1913–2005), British aeronautical engineer
Alec Davies (born 1962), Scottish former cricketer and current physical education teacher
Alec Davies (footballer) (1920–1998), Scottish footballer
Alec Debnam (1921–2003), English cricketer and Royal Air Force member
Alec de Candole (1897–1918), English poet and military personnel
Alec Denton (born 1994), English footballer
Alec Devon Kreider (1991–2017), American murderer
Alec Dick (footballer) (1865–1925), Scottish footballer
Alec Dickson (1914–1994), British activist and V.S.O. founder
Alec Distaso (1948–2009), American MLB player
Alec Dockar (1920–1994), English professional rugby league footballer
Alec Donald (1900–1952), Scottish professional footballer
Alec Douglas (1939–2014), South African cricketer
Alec Douglas-Home (1903–1995), British politician, Prime Minister of the U.K. (1963–1964)
Alec Down (1914–1995), British archaeologist
Alec Duffy, American writer and theater director
Alec Dufty (born 1987), American former soccer player and current coach
Alec Eason (1889–1956), Australian rules footballer, coach, and administrator
Alec Eist (1929–1982), British police officer and Navy personnel
Alec Elliot (born 1996), Canadian competitive Paralympic swimmer
Alec Empire (born 1972), German musician
Alec Epis (born 1937), Australian former footballer
Alec Erwin (born 1948), South African politician
Alec Evans (born 1939), Australian former rugby union footballer and coach
Alec Farley (1925–2010), English professional footballer
Alec Farmer (1908–1986), Scottish professional footballer
Alec Farrall (born 1936), English former professional footballer
Alec Farrow (1894–1955), Australian rules footballer
Alec Finlay (born 1966), Scottish artist
Alec Finn (1944–2018), British musician
Alec Firth (1892–?), British trade union official
Alec Foege, American author and magazine journalist
Alec Fong Lim (1931–1990), Australian politician
Alec Fraser (disambiguation), several people
Alec Fyfe (1909–1973), Australian rules footballer
Alec G. Olson (born 1930), American politician
Alec Gallup (1928–2009), American pollster
Alec Garnett, American politician
Alec Gaskell (1932–2014), English professional footballer
Alec Geddes (1878–?), Scottish communist activist
Alec George Horwood (1914–1944), British soldier
Alec Georgen (born 1998), French professional footballer
Alec Gibson (born 1963), American former NFL player
Alec Gillies (1875–1932), Scottish footballer
Alec Glassey (1887–1970), British politician
Alec Glen, Scottish amateur footballer
Alec Gores (born 1953), American billionaire businessman
Alec Graham (1929–2021), English Anglican bishop
Alec Grant (1893–1966), New Zealand cricketer and military personnel of Australian descent
Alec Gray, several people
Alec Greven, American self-help author
Alec Grieve (1864–1933), Dundee artist
Alec Guinness (1914–2000), English actor
Alec Hall, several people
Alec Hanley Bemis, American writer, manager, and record producer
Alec Hannan (1916–2002), South African boxer
Alec Hansen (born 1994), American former baseball player
Alec Hardie (1900–1975), Scottish professional footballer
Alec Hardinge, 2nd Baron Hardinge of Penshurst (1894–1960), British Army personnel
Alec Hardy (1891–1970), Anglican bishop
Alec Harper (1910–2003), English polo player and Indian Army officer
Alec Harris (1897–1974), Welsh spiritualist medium
Alec Hastilow (1895–1975), English cricketer and cricket administrator
Alec Head (born 1924), French horse trainer and breeder
Alec Hearne (1863–1952), English cricketer
Alec Hellewell (1880–1934), English footballer
Alec Hepburn (born 1993), English rugby union player
Alec Herd (1911–1982), Scottish professional footballer
Alec Higgins (1908–1965), English professional rugby league footballer
Alec Hill (1916–2008), Australian military historian and academic
Alec Holowka (1983–2019), Canadian game programmer, designer, and musician
Alec Hooper (1900–1978), English professional footballer
Alec Horsley (1902–1993), British businessman, Quaker, and peace activist
Alec Horwood (1914–1944), British Army officer
Alec Hosie (1890–1957), English cricketer
Alec Howie (1913–1940), Indian Army cricketer and British Army personnel
Alec Hurley (1871–1913), English music hall singer
Alec Hurwood (1902–1982), Australian cricketer
Alec Inch (1915–1994), Australian engine driver and politician
Alec Ingold (born 1996), American NFL player
Alec Ingwersen (1941–2016), Australian rules footballer
Alec Issigonis (1906–1988), Greek-British car designer
Alec Jackson, several people
Alec James (cricketer) (1889–1961), Welsh cricketer
Alec Jason (1911–2000), English actor
Alec Jeffreys (born 1950), British geneticist
Alec Jenkins (born 1987), Welsh rugby union player
Alec John Dawson (1872–1951), English author
Alec John Such (born 1952), American bassist, former member of Bon Jovi
Alec Johnson (born 1944), English former cricketer
Alec Johnson (rugby league) (1901–?), Australian rugby league footballer
Alec Jones (1924–1983), British politician
Alec Julian Tyndale-Biscoe (1906–1997), English naval engineer and officer
Alec K. Redfearn, American musician and composer
Alec Kann (born 1990), American MLS player
Alec Kaplan (1890–1963), South African philatelist
Alec Karakatsanis (born 1983), American civil rights lawyer, social justice advocate, public defender, and prison reformer
Alec Kay (1879–1917), Scottish professional footballer and military personnel
Alec Kellaway (1894–1973), Australian actor of South African descent
Alec Kennedy (1891–1959), Scottish cricketer
Alec Kerr (1876–1953), New Zealand cricketer
Alec Kessler (1967–2007), American basketball player and orthopedic surgeon
Alec King (1874–1954), Australian rules footballer and officer
Alec Kirkbride (1897–1978), British diplomat
Alec Kirkland (1900–?), Irish footballer
Alec Kitson (1921–1997), British trade unionist and official
Alec Knight (born 1939), British chaplain
Alec Kruger (1924–2015), Australian non-fiction writer
Alec Lamont (1850–1934), English barrister
Alec Lanham-Love (born 1961), South African sailor
Alec Law (1910–?), Scottish professional footballer
Alec Lazenby (born 1927), English-born Australian academic and writer
Alec Lazo, Cuban-American ballroom dancer
Alec Lemon (born 1991), American former football player
Alec Leonce (born 1962), British bobsledder
Alec Leslie (1900–1961), Scottish professional footballer
Alec Lindsay (born 1948), English former footballer
Alec Lindstrom (born 1998), American football player
Alec Linwood (1920–2003), Scottish footballer
Alec Logan (1882–1918), Scottish footballer
Alec Longstreth (born 1979), American comics creator and illustrator
Alec Lorimer (1896–?), Scottish footballer and ASL player
Alec Lorimore (born 1948), American film director, film producer, and screenwriter
Alec Lucas (born 1945), Welsh former professional footballer
Alec Luyckx (born 1995), Belgian professional footballer
Alec MacKaye (born 1966), American punk vocalist
Alec Mackie (1903–1984), Irish footballer
Alec Mackie (Scottish footballer), Scottish footballer
Alec Mango (1911–1989), English actor
Alec Mann (1902–?), English professional snooker player
Alec Mapa (born 1965), Filipino-American actor
Alec Marantz (born 1959), American linguist and researcher
Alec Marks (1910–1983), Australian cricketer
Alec Marr, Australian environmentalist
Alec Marsh (born 1998), American MLB player
Alec Marshall, American professional soccer player
Alec Martinez (born 1987), American NHL player
Alec Mathieson (born 1921), Australian rules former footballer
Alec Mawhinney (1894–1967), Australian rules footballer
Alec Mazo (born 1978), Belarusian American producer and former professional dancer
Alec McCartney (1879–1968), Irish international footballer
Alec McClure (1892–1971), English professional footballer
Alec McCowen (1925–2007), English actor
Alec McCue (1927–1989), Scottish professional footballer
Alec McDonald, several people
Alec McHoul (born 1952), Anglo-Australian ethnomethodologist
Alec McKenzie (1882–1968), Australian rules footballer
Alec McLean (born 1950), New Zealand former rower
Alec McNair (1882–1951), Scottish footballer and manager
Alec Mercer (1891–1977), English footballer
Alec Merrison (1924–1989), British physicist
Alec Mildren (1915–1998), Australian racing driver
Alec Mills (born 1991), American MLB player
Alec Mills (soccer) (born 2000), Australian professional footballer
Alec Milne (born 1937), Scottish former professional footballer
Alec Milne (footballer, born 1889) (1889–1970), English footballer
Alec Monk (born 1942), British businessman and brewer
Alec Monopoly (born 1980s), American graffiti artist and DJ
Alec Monteath (1941–2021), Scottish television actor and broadcaster
Alec Monteith (1886–1972), New Zealand politician, farmer, and trade unionist
Alec Moores (1919–2014), Canadian politician
Alec Morgan (1908–1957), Australian rules footballer
Alec Morris (fl. 1910s), New Zealand professional rugby league footballer
Alec Moyse (1935–1994), English footballer
Alec Mudimu (born 1995), Zimbabwean footballer
Alec Muffett (born 1968), Anglo-American internet-security evangelist, architect, and software engineer
Alec Mullen (born 1966), Scottish former boxer
Alec Musser (born 1973), American fitness model and actor
Alec Mutch (1889–1960), Australian rules footballer and umpire
Alec N. Wildenstein (1940–2008), French-born American billionaire businessman, art dealer, racehorse owner, and breeder
Alec Năstac (born 1949), Romanian boxer and Olympic medalist
Alec Naylor Dakin (1912–2003), English Egyptologist, cryptographer, and schoolmaster
Alec Neill (born 1950), New Zealand politician
Alec Nevala-Lee (born 1980), American novelist, biographer, and science fiction writer
Alec Newman (born 1974), Scottish actor
Alec Ogilvie (1882–1962), British early aviation pioneer
Alec Ogilvie (businessman) (1913–1997), British business executive
Alec Ogletree (born 1991), American NFL player
Alec O'Hanley, member of Two Hours Traffic
Alec O'Leary, Irish musician and director
Alec Olney (1922–2017), British long-distance runner
Alec O'Riordan (born 1940), Irish former cricketer
Alec Ormiston (1884–1952), Scottish footballer
Alec Ounsworth (born 1977), American singer-songwriter and guitarist
Alec Oxenford, Argentine entrepreneur
Alec Page (born 1993), Canadian former competitive swimmer
Alec Pantaleo (born 1996), American wrestler
Alec Parker (born 1974), American former rugby union player
Alec Parker (cricketer) (born 1955), Australian cricketer
Alec Peak (1916–1997), Australian rules footballer
Alec Pearce (1910–1982), English cricketer
Alec Pecker (1893–1975), British painter
Alec Peters (born 1995), American NBA player
Alec Peterson (1908–1988), British educator, founder of the International Baccalaureate
Alec Pierce (born 2000), American football player
Alec Poitevint (born 1947), American politician
Alec Poole, Irish racing driver
Alec Potts (born 1996), Australian competitive archer
Alec Price (1913–1999), Australian cricketer
Alec Proudfoot (1906–1995), Australian rules footballer
Alec Purdie (born 1988), American soccer player
Alec Puro (born 1975), American musician, songwriter, and composer
Alec R. Costandinos (born 1944), French composer, music producer, and singer-songwriter
Alec Rasizade (born 1947), Azerbaijani-American retired professor
Alec Rauhauser (born 1995), American ice hockey player
Alec Rayme (born 1978), American actor
Alec Reed (born 1934), English business writer, philanthropist, and humanist
Alec Reeves (1902–1971), British scientist
Alec Regula (born 2000), American NHL player
Alec Reid (1931–2013), Irish Catholic priest
Alec Reid (footballer) (1897–1969), Scottish footballer
Alec Reid (rugby union) (1878–1952), South African international rugby union player
Alec Riddolls (1908–1963), New Zealand cricketer
Alec Robertson (disambiguation), several people
Alec Rodger (1907–1982), British occupational psychologist
Alec Rose (1908–1991), English nursery owner and fruit merchant
Alec Ross (disambiguation), several people
Alec Roth (born 1948), English composer
Alec Rowley (1892–1958), English composer, organist, pianist, lecturer, and music writer
Alec Roxburgh (1910–1985), English professional footballer
Alec Russell, English journalist
Alec Ryrie (born 1971), British historian of religion, Anglican, and writer
Alec Sabin (born 1947), British actor
Alec Scheiner (born 1973), American attorney and private equity investor
Alec Scott (1906–1978), British horse rider
Alec Secăreanu (born 1984), Romanian stage, television, and film actor
Alec Sehon (1924–2018), Romanian-born Canadian immunologist
Alec Seward (1901–1972), American singer-songwriter and guitarist
Alec Shankly, Scottish professional footballer
Alec Shelbrooke (born 1976), British politician
Alec Shellogg (1914–1968), American NFL player
Alec Shepperson (born 1936), English amateur golfer
Alec Skelding (1886–1960), English cricketer and umpire
Alec Skempton (1914–2001), British civil engineer
Alec Sloan (1870–1938), Australian rules footballer
Alec Smight (born 1959), American film editor and television director
Alec Smith (disambiguation), several people
Alec Snow (born 1945), Canadian businessperson and former politician
Alec Sokolow (born 1965), American screenwriter
Alec Soth (born 1969), American photographer
Alec Southwell (1926–2018), Australian judge
Alec Spalding (1923–2007), British radar operator and agricultural economist
Alec Stander (born 1979), South African cricketer
Alec Statham (1912–1977), British speedway rider
Alec Stevens (born 1965), Brazilian-born American author, illustrator, and musician
Alec Stewart (disambiguation), several people
Alec Stock (1917–2001), English footballer and manager
Alec Stokes (1919–2003), British physicist
Alec Stone Sweet, American political scientist and jurist
Alec Su (born 1973), Taiwanese musician and actor
Alec Sulkin (born 1973), American writer, producer, and voice actor
Alec Sundly (born 1992), American soccer player
Alec Sutherland (1922–2014), Scottish swimmer, swimming coach, mountain climber, and airman
Alec Swann (born 1976), English former cricketer
Alec Talbot (1902–1975), English footballer
Alec Taylor, several people
Alec Templeton (1909–1963), British composer
Alec Tennant, Australian former professional rugby league footballer
Alec Thomas (1894–?), Canadian fisherman, trapper, longshoreman, logger, interpreter, anthropologist, and politician
Alec Thompson (1916–2001), English cricketer
Alec Thomson (1873–1953), English-born Australian politician
Alec Thomson (footballer) (1901–1975), Scottish footballer
Alec Thurlow (1922–1956), English footballer
Alec Tidey (born 1955), Canadian former NHL player
Alec Tod (1898–1977), British equestrian
Alec Torelli (born 1987), American poker player
Alec Trendall (1928–2013), English geologist, poet, and explorer
Alec Troup (1909–?), Scottish professional rugby league footballer
Alec Udell (born 1995), American racing driver
Alec Urosevski (born 1994), Australian footballer
Alec Utgoff (born 1986), Soviet-born English actor
Alec Valentine (1928–1997), Scottish international rugby union footballer
Alec Van Hoorenbeeck (born 1998), Belgian footballer
Alec Vary (1908–1977), Australian rules footballer
Alec Vidler (1899–1991), English Anglican priest, theologian, and ecclesiastical historian
Alec Vinci (born 1999), Australian professional footballer
Alec Wainman (1913–1989), British photographer, Quaker, and Slavonic scholar
Alec Waterman (born 1996), Australian rules footballer
Alec Waugh (1898–1981), British novelist
Alec Wilder (1907–1980), American composer
Alec Wilkinson (born 1952), American writer
Alec Wills (1911–1941), English cricketer and Royal Air Force officer
Alec Wintering (born 1995), American basketball player
Alec Wood (1933–2016), Australian mycologist
Alec Yoder (born 1997), American artistic gymnast
Alec Young (1925–2010), Scottish footballer and coach
Anthony Seibu Alec Abban (1928–1985), Ghanaian politician

Fiction
Alec the Great, American newspaper comic strip
Alec Forbes of Howglen, Scottish novel by George MacDonald
Alec: A Novel, 2021 continuation of Maurice (1975)
Alec Gilroy, fictional character in Coronation Street
Alec of Kerry, fictional character in The Nightrunner Series by Lynn Flewelling
Alec Lightwood, fictional character in The Shadowhunter Chronicles
 Alec Mason, fictional character in Red Faction: Guerilla
Alec McDowell, fictional character in Dark Angel
Alec McEwan, fictional character in Journey to the Center of the Earth
Alec Trevelyan, fictional character in GoldenEye
 Alec of the Volturi coven in the Twilight saga by Stephenie Meyer
 Alec Ramsay, fictional character in The Black Stallion books and movies
Alec Ryder father of protagonist in Mass Effect Andromeda
 Alec D'Urberville, fictional character in Tess of the d'Urbervilles by Thomas Hardy
 Alec Scudder, fictional character in Maurice by E.M. Forster DI Alec Hardy, fictional character in the Broadchurch'' TV show by Chris Chibnall
Alec Holland, fictional character in the Swamp Thing comic series

See also
Alec Hunter Academy, British school
American Legislative Exchange Council, nonprofit organization of conservative state legislators and private sector representatives

Alek, given name

English masculine given names